This is the character list of 2021 Ultra Series Ultraman Trigger: New Generation Tiga, as well as the 2022 follow-up sequel, Ultraman Decker. Both shows inherited the elements from Ultraman Tiga and Ultraman Dyna respectively as part of celebrating the 25th anniversary of TDG multimedia program. In addition, the list also contains characters from related media such as Ultra Galaxy Fight: The Destined Crossroad and Ultraman Regulos.

Protagonists

Kengo Manaka
 is the 21-year-old protagonist of Ultraman Trigger: New Generation Tiga, known for being sociable and kind while bearing a sense of justice. Kengo is actually Ultraman Trigger's inner light incarnated into a human, who Reina Manaka discovered during her expedition into the petrified Ultra's ruins as an infant. He spent the remainder of his life raised in the Martian colony, taking on the job as a botanist to study the genetically-modified flower , hoping to make it bloom one day.

After receiving a nightmare regarding the dark giant and witnessing Golba's attack on the Martian settlement, Kengo merged with the eponymous Ultraman Trigger and moved to Earth, becoming the newest member of GUTS-Select. Kengo would later be banished into the past when Carmeara used her curse to revert Trigger into Trigger Dark. Through Yuzare's help, he created a time loop by convincing the dark Ultra's past iteration into defecting from his fellow members and eventually returning to the present day with gaining access to Glitter Trigger Eternity. In addition to discovering his status as the reincarnation of Trigger's inner light, Kengo swore to protect Yuna after his failure to do so with Yuzare in the past. After defeating Carmeara/Megalothor, Kengo's wish for R'lyeh to bloom came true, but he is forced to be separated from his friends in order to stabilize the Eternity Core by fusing with it. Two years later in Ultraman Trigger: Episode Z, Kengo is freed from the Core when his life started to diminish, but is later dragged into another battle against Rylar, a cult led by Zabil who stole Trigger's powers as part of becoming an Ultraman himself. After the battle, Kengo joins in the celebration with his fellow GUTS-Select members while resuming his life as both human and Ultraman once more.

Kengo eventually left the Earth and returned a decade later in Ultraman Decker, bringing along the Ultra Dual Sword when it guides him towards the titular Ultra and the new generation of GUTS-Select members. Joining forces with his successor Kanata/Decker, the two made their move to fight against the resurrected Megalothor on Earth and finally departing with Carmeara after giving the sword to Kanata.

Ultraman Ribut
First appearing in Ultra Galaxy Fight: New Generation Heroes,  is a member of the Galaxy Rescue Force and the protagonist of Galaxy Rescue Force Voice Drama, a mini series that chronicles his early days of participation into the elite team after events of The Absolute Conspiracy. Aside from his interactions with fellow team members, Ribut then fights against their rogue member "Daada" and eventually departed to Earth (specifically in Malaysia) to both training himself and to fight against the increasing monster attacks.

In Ultra Galaxy Fight: The Destined Crossroad, Ribut and the rest of the Ultra League reported to the Inter Galactic Defense Force after failing to stop Yullian's kidnapping. Under the Father of Ultra, he is reinstated into the latter group and supported the Ultra Force on Planet Babel, wherein Nexus' intervention convinces the young Ultra to prevent their war with the Absolutians. After his brief death and resurrection, Ribut's attempt at shielding his companions from the crossfire between Ultraman King and Tartarus on  resulted with him and the two Absolutians dragged into a wormhole.

Alongside Tartarus and Diavolo, Ribut found himself in the middle of Ultraman Trigger as he once again meddled with the Absolutians' affair, while also training Kengo on how to fully control the Glitter Trigger Eternity. His Hyper Key is left to Yuna's possession after finishing his mission on Earth, which GUTS-Select would utilize to empower the Nursedessei in delivering a mercy kill to a brainwashed Darrgon.

 reprises his voice role as Ultraman Ribut in Japanese, and Josh Keller in the English dub of The Destined Crossroad.

Marluru
 is a young alien who serves as the team's operator and monster informant. Aside from his appearance in Ultraman Trigger, Marluru is also one of the three main characters in Secret Origins of the Nursedessei: The Struggle of Special Section 3.

Prior to the foundation of GUTS-Select, Marluru accepted the offer to join TPU from then-staff officer Tatsumi through their common ground, and since then swore his life debt on the captain himself. Under Tatsumi's suggestion, he was initially assigned to Special Section 3 for the development of vehicles that would be used by GUTS-Select in the future. Working alongside Hotta and Yazaki, Marluru's backdoor deal with Alien Wild "Zagar" becomes the key to the creation of Nursedessei, developing it alongside Akito before they would eventually be assigned to GUTS-Select. In Ultraman Chronicle D, Marluru rented an apartment at some point after Evil Trigger's destruction and is forced to share it with a freeloading Deban to his dismay. By the time GUTS-Select was disbanded, Marluru remains on Earth up to the events of Ultraman Decker, wherein he rejoins Special Section 3 in supporting the new generation of GUTS-Select members through maintenance and creation of their vehicles.

Marluru is voiced by M・A・O. The Alien Metron race first appeared in episode 8 of Ultraseven.

Deban
In Ultraman Chronicle D, Deban freeloads into Marluru's apartment under Tatsumi's suggestion after failing to join the GUTS-Select membership, wherein he provides exposition of past Ultras while inviting past characters as guests to Marluru's house. By the end of Chronicle D, Deban took the advice of relying on his own strength to heart, deciding to forfeit his membership and leaving Marluru's house to continue his travel.

Ultraman Regulos
 is an Ultra who debuted in Ultra Galaxy Fight: The Destined Crossroad, previously appearing in The Absolute Conspiracy as a silhouetted figure who was imprisoned alongside Yullian by the Absolutians. He is also set to appear as the protagonist of his own eponymous spin-off media.

Regulos was originally an amnesiac Ultra who found himself on Planet D60 after a near-death experience. He was recruited by Master Alude to join the Cosmo Beast Style and trains with his fellow students, as well as befriending the Leo Brothers from the neighboring planet. When the Alien Magma launched their attack on both planets, Regulos fail to save his fellow students from their deaths and was imprisoned by The Kingdom as part of their attempt in studying the Ultra Warriors. Due to the situation of his kidnapping, Regulos became a Parallel Isotope despite being around the same age as the Leo Brothers during the latter's active period on Earth. While recovering his strength through Yullian's help, Regulos break free from his restrains during the Ultras' intrusion into the Absolute Palace, eventually joining forces with the Leo Brothers once again to avenge Alude's death by defeating Diavolo. Following Tartarus, Diavolo and Ribut's disappearances, Regulos resumed his new life on the Land of Light while keeping the title of the grand master to himself in honor of Alude.

Kanata Asumi
 is the 20-year-old protagonist of Ultraman Decker, a kind young man who originally worked at his family's rice cracker store, . Kanata becomes Ultraman Decker to fight the invaders while at the same time joining the newly-reformed GUTS-Select as their newest member. As the fight progresses, Kanata learns of Decker's power coming from his future descendant of similar namesake but when given the option to retire as an Ultra, he persists and unlocks Dynamic Type, a form that is unique to Kanata himself. Near the finale of the series, Kanata gets infected by the Spheres' essence that slowly hampers his fighting skills, but manages to pull through long enough to deliver the final blow against Mother Spheresaurus and eradicating the Spheres' threats, forcing him to part ways with Ultraman Decker.

Kanata Asumi transforms into Ultraman Decker with the Ultra D Flasher and a set of  pertaining to Decker's forms. In addition, scanning the  allows him to summon Dimension Card Monsters as Decker's limited-time supporters. At the end of his encounter with Kengo, Kanata inherited the Ultra Dual Sword and Trigger's set of cards for Decker's use in subsequent battles.

GUTS-Select
GUTS-Select is a defense team under TPU Japan branch that fights against monster attacks, with Mitsukuni establishing them using the knowledge of GUTS in mind. In the middle of its 7 years devoid of monster attacks, GUTS-Select was briefly disbanded and most of its members has since moved to Mars while Marluru remains on Earth. In addition, their combat mecha were modified into autopiloted drones when TPU begins to cut costs in Earth defenses in favor of space exploration. In Ultraman Decker, when the Spheres invade and confine Earth, GUTS-Select is reformed a year later to combat them through its list of new members while retaining most of its predecessor's assets.

Ultraman Trigger era

Yuna Shizuma
 is a 17, later 18-year-old member who is the daughter of Mitsukuni, Sizuma Foundation's chairman. In addition to being talented, she received privilege education since her childhood. Yuna still attends high school and is in charge of guiding the team's new rookie, Kengo, in missions. As a descendant of Yuzare, Yuna is in constant danger of being targeted by the Giants of Darkness in order for them to access the Eternity Core while she tries to deal with the burden of her ancestor. In the middle of the series, Yuna learns of Kengo's double life as Trigger after Akito mistook Trigger Dark for his host. At some point during Kyrieloid's reign of terror, Yuna reaches her full potential as Yuzare's successor as the Giants of Darkness try to aim for her life again. She was captured by Carmeara after Darrgon's death and forced to be the key to the Eternity Core wherein the dark Ultra mutated herself into Megalothor. In the final battle, Yuna is able to use Yuzare's powers to redirect the Eternity Core's energy into Nursedessei, granting Trigger the necessary power boost to destroy Megalothor.

At the time of Ultraman Decker taking place, Yuna has become her father's secretary in Sizuma Foundation and is trapped on Earth when the Spheres isolated it from the rest of the universe, separating her from the rest of her former GUTS-Select colleague when they were on Mars. When Kengo briefly returned to Earth, Yuna approaches him to reveal of Gijeran's presence and join forces with the new GUTS-Select to fight against Sphere-Megalothor.

Akito Hijiri
 is the 18-year-old genius engineer who is in charge of development. He designed most of GUTS-Select's weapons and mechas, and spent most of his time in Nursedessei's lab for researching stone slabs and artifacts from the Ultra Ancient Civilization.

Six years prior to the series, the Hijiri family were scientists of Sizuma Foundation who assisted in the repair of GUTS Wing 1 to fight against Deathdrago. Akito lost his parents to the very same monster and had since adopted under Mitsukuni's care. As Akito grows to accept Mitsukuni as his parental substitute, he also met Yuna and harboring a one-sided crush on her, to the point of attending the same high school in the present day. He sees Kengo as a rival and tends to bickering with him, being envious of the latter's inheritance over Trigger's power, but the slowly grew close as the series progresses. In Ultraman Decker, Akito is among the survivors of Sphere's attack on Mars and joins the former GUTS-Select members to defend other survivors from Sphere's reign of terror.

Tesshin Sakuma
 is the 40-year-old pilot of Nursedessei, the oldest among his team members. He is a hot-blooded person who is friendly to his teammates, regardless of their ranks. He acts as a big brother figure to Kengo, but Akito and Himari are intolerable to his presence. Although he was absent in Ultraman Decker, Tesshin is among the survivors of Sphere's attack on Mars and joins the former GUTS-Select members to defend other survivors from Sphere's reign of terror.

Himari Nanase
 is a 26-year-old operation specialist whose initial stern and dutiful turns into a hot-blooded pilot when handling the GUTS Falcons in aerial combat. Although she was absent in Ultraman Decker, Himari is among the survivors of Sphere's attack on Mars and joins the former GUTS-Select members to defend other survivors from Sphere's reign of terror.

Seiya Tatsumi
 is the 38-year-old captain of GUTS-Select, who provides commands from the Nursedessei's cockpit. He balances with being strict and kind to his teammates at the same time. Alongside Akito, Tatsumi is well aware of Yuna's ancestry and Mitsukuni's origin, but keeps it to himself until he reveals it to GUTS-Select on the day of Yuna's 18th birthday. He even figures out Kengo's identity as Ultraman Trigger, but keeps it for himself before Kengo reveal it to GUTS-Select. In Ultraman Decker, Tatsumi is among the survivors of Sphere's attack on Mars and leads the former GUTS-Select members to defend other survivors from Sphere's reign of terror.

Ultraman Decker era

Ichika Kirino
 is a hot-blooded and athletic 20-year-old member who can perform quick maneuvers despite her short stature. She joins the GUTS-Select in hopes of restoring peace to Earth and saving the friends she had lost from the Spheres' attack.

Soma Ryumon
 is the cool-headed 20-year-old GUTS Falcon pilot who gains the moniker "observant genius" from his captain due to his observant eye. His membership into GUTS-Select was inspired from his experience of being rescued by a TPU soldier in his childhood, hence training himself to join the team against his father's wishes.

Sawa Kaizaki
 is the 29-year-old vice captain of the reformed GUTS-Select and the pilot/operator of Nursedessei. In addition to being a stern sub-captain to the rest of the team, she is also a leading authority on monsters, due to her doctorate in biology.

Taiji Murahoshi
 is the 38-year-old captain of the reformed GUTS-Select. He is a junior to Seiya Tatsumi and is a former TPU ace pilot, initially taking the job of a principal in TPU's training school in the middle of the declining monster attacks before he rejoined the front lines once the Sphere commences their invasion on Earth.

HANE2
 is an artificial intelligence developed by TPU, who would later on receive the nickname  from Kanata. It was originally intended to pilot a spacecraft for outer space development, but due to the threats of Spheres on Earth, HANE2 is assigned to GUTS-SELECT, piloting the GUTS Hawk and usually providing support for the team's aerial combat. Due the circumstances for Decker's fight with Sphere Gomora, Kanata revealed his identity as the Ultra's host to HANE2, the latter had since agreed to keep his teammate's identity a secret. HANE2 is later assigned to pilot Terraphaser to replace its fried AI, despite piloting the robot is against its original expertise. In Ultraman Decker Finale: Journey to Beyond, HANE3, nickname , is developed.

It is a tribute to Hanejiro from Ultraman Dyna.

Arsenal and mecha
Common
Normally in the default , it can transform into the dragon-like . Nursedessei is designed by Akito after obtaining the data of Nurse from Alien Wild Zagar, but due to the high consumption of energy needed in activating the Battle Mode, the latter form was shelved until the appearance of Absolutians on Earth has GUTS-Select stealing Diavolo's Absolute Particles to empower their mothership. In Ultraman Decker, Nursedessei was originally modified into an autopiloted battleship but Spheresaurus' attack that causes signal interference forced it to revert to manual piloting at some point during GUTS-Select's reformation. In Ultraman Decker Finale: Journey to Beyond,  is developed.
: An unmanned aircraft which can be controlled through VR from the Nursedessei cockpit. Originally in the default , it can transform into the  during combat. The GUTS Falcon was created using Mitsukuni's modified GUTS Wing 1 as a basis. It can also be manually piloted through a hidden cockpit in case if the VR system is rendered unusable. In Ultraman Decker, the GUTS Falcon is repurposed for manual piloting as a result of Sphere's activity disabling the VR flight system and the autopiloting system. The jet is mainly piloted by Kanata and gains the ability to combine with GUTS Hawk to form GUTS Gryphon.

Ultraman Trigger era
: The GUTS-Select's standard firearm weapon, which can be used in conjunction with the Hyper Keys as bullets. It was created by Akito Hijiri through reverse engineering of the Ancient Sparklence. Transformable variants of the GUTS Sparklence (like Kengo's model) would later be used by Haruki and Ribut during their presence in Kengo's Earth. The weapon is based on Daigo Madoka's Sparklence and the GUTS Hyper Gun in Ultraman Tiga.
: A relic from the Ultra Ancient era which serves as the basis of GUTS Sparklence. Initially under the Terran Protection Team's ownership, its original purpose is to gather the lights from the stars and was initially in Yuzare's possession, who gave it to a time-displaced Kengo in an attempt to reach Trigger Dark. In Episode Z, Zabil uses the device in conjunction with Trigger's Hyper Keys stolen from Kengo to transform into Evil Trigger.
: Magazines created by Akito as ammunition for GUTS Sparklence. Kengo has the Keys which allows him to transform into Trigger or providing the Ultra with his Type Changes. They are based on the energy cartridges of GUTS Hyper Gun in Ultraman Tiga.
: Counterparts of the GUTS Hyper Keys which has the powers of a monster, allowing users to harness a portion of their powers as energy bullets.
: A U-shaped recoilless cannon that can harness the power of three Kaiju Keys into a single large beam. It is mainly used by highly trained members due to its weight.
: A rifle that Akito created with the ability to harness three different Kaiju Keys and can be switched from either single or continuous firing.

Ultraman Decker era
: A red-colored aircraft which HANE2 piloted to support the pilots of GUTS Falcon. It was initially built as a space exploration-use vehicle, but is reassigned to GUTS-Select at the height of Spheres' invasion. Originally in the default Flight Mode, it can transform into the  that exudes a pair of boosters and tail.
: The combined form of GUTS Falcon after docking with GUTS Hawk.
: The GUTS-Select's standard firearm weapon. Depending on the combat situation, it can be customized into either  or  through attachment parts.
: Codenamed DG001, Terraphaser is a TR Particle-powered autonomous giant robot created by Agams while posing as Asakage. Intended by the Bazdor native as his own means of assisting the Spheres and destroying Decker, he masks the project as part of strengthening TPU's assets. HANE2 briefly acted as its initial pilot, doing so to replace the damaged AI but Agams hijacked the robot once he finally show his true colors to menace the GUTS-Select members on multiple occasions. It was then reclaimed by GUTS-Select after Agams sacrificed himself to shield Decker and returns to service at the height of Mother Spheresaurus' invasion. When hijacked by Agams, the Phase Riser allows Terraphaser to channel the power of Mons Dimension Cards onto its own. Secretly from its early creation, Agams had installed a Sphere into the robot as a form of energy source. The robot is based on Deathfacer from Ultraman Tiga and Ultraman Dyna: Warriors of the Star of Light.

TPU
 is an organization formed by the joint collaboration of Sizuma Foundation and worldwide nations six years prior to the series in anticipation of monsters and dark forces that threatens the safety of Planet Earth.

Mitsukuni Shizuma
Mitsukuni's true identity is a TPC investigation officer from the Neo Frontier universe who accidentally entered the world of Trigger 30 years prior through the series when his GUTS Wing entered a space-time vortex. At some point later on, he married Yurika and they established Sizuma Foundation. Six years prior to the series, Mitsukuni discovered the incoming threats from Giants of Darkness and monster attacks through the Ultra Ancient ruins, but his words fell on deaf's ears until the appearance of Deathdrago validated his claims. Under his leadership, the Sizuma Foundation is in charge of interstellar exploration and studies, as well as providing necessary funds to TPU and its proxy, GUTS-Select. At the time of Deathdrago's attack, Mitsukuni's sole supporters were the Hijiri family scientists, taking the young Akito under his care to honor his parents' sacrifices.

During Golba's attack on the Martian colony, Mitsukuni and Reina bear witness to Kengo's fight against the monster and its master, Carmeara, when the ancient prophecy was fulfilled in the present day. In addition to his memory of Ultraman Tiga, Mitsukuni decided to induct Kengo into the newly-formed GUTS-Select. During Kyrieloid's fight with Ultraman Trigger, a piece of Tiga's light was revealed to have been in Mitsukuni all along, which allows Yuna/Yuzare to summon Ultraman Tiga to assist Trigger in their fight against the extradimensional being.

Special Section 3
 is a department in TPU that is managed by Hotta. Marluru used to join the team under Tatsumi's suggestion before he was recruited into GUTS-Select. During the events of Decker, Marluru returns to Special Section 3 under the demands of TPU to assist Hotta with behind the scene projects for the new GUTS-Select.

: Marluru's boss, who is prone to stomach ache during stresses. Masamichi then appears in episode 24 of Trigger to assist GUTS-Select in their immediate repair of Nursedessei in the light of Megalothor's rampage. He returns in Decker, now aged 60 years old and reunites with Marluru to assist the new members of GUTS-Select with frequent maintenances.
: The dutiful accountant who belongs to TPU's accounting department and easily befriends with Marluru despite their different personalities.

Other members
Secret Origins of the Nursedessei
: An alien who works at TPU's public relations department: special section 3. In episode 13, he relays the rumor of Alien Wild Zagar's arrival on Earth to Marluru, which sets the motion of Nursedessei's creation.
: An alien who works part-time at TPU's cafeteria. He came to Earth to study its literature.
: An alien who works at TPU's investigation department: sciences team. She is voiced by You Murakami and first appeared in episode 17 of Ultraman Cosmos.
: An alien who works at TPU's maintenance department. During an alien meeting held by Marluru, Cicadaman attempts to provide his idea, only for the language barrier for his kind's language rendering it impossible for the rest of the aliens to understand. First appeared in episode 16 of Ultra Q.
: An alien who works at TPU's accounting department and is in charge of accounting for its department of technological development: special section 2. During a meeting discussion held by Marluru, Pitoko provided the data of Eleking which was saved into a Monster Key.
: An alien who works at TPU's security department. During the second alien meeting held by Marluru, he gave TPU the data of Zetton which was saved into a Monster Key.

Ultraman Decker
Yuko crosses paths with Ichika when Elly started its attack, asking GUTS-Select's help in feeding her monster. Once the situation has been resolved, Yuko is allowed to keep the now larva Eleking, with Sawa giving her guidance over the monster's feeding habit. In GUTS-Select Exchange Report: Special Section 3 Returns, she was scouted by Murahoshi into working at TPU's cafeteria and through there, she reunited with Ichika while being able to assume her true form. After delivering lunch to Special Section 3, she commissioned Hotta to build an autonomous machine to feed Elly periodically.
: A non-binary alien who serves as the director of TPU's internal affairs and has an affinity for classical music despite their by-the-book attitude. Nigel suspends Murahoshi in the light of Agams' betrayal, due to his close relation to "Asakage", as well as for going AWOL during Metsu-Orochi's rampage. After Ryumon clears Murahoshi of his accusations, Nigel removes the captain's suspension and takes their leave, finally acknowledging GUTS-Select's competency in against monster attacks.

TPU mechas
: TPC and GUTS' main combat aircraft from Ultraman Tiga. It was originally young Mitsukuni's jet during his time as a TPC investigation officer and ended up trapped in the world of Trigger alongside its pilot. After being fixed by Akito's parents, Mitsukuni piloted it to fight against the threat of Deathdrago and was later on becoming the basis of TPU and GUTS-Select's technology. To conceal the aircraft's nature from the other universe, it was covered up as a government technology by TPU and Sizuma Foundation. The GUTS Wing was later modified into a VR-guided aircraft that eventually becomes the forerunner of the GUTS Falcon.

Other major characters

Ignis
 is a 334-year-old treasure hunter who aims for world class treasures, hence his intergalactic adventures lead him to Earth. 100 years prior to the series, Ignis survived the destruction of Planet Lishuria after Hudram terrorized it, swearing vengeance on the dark giant ever since. In the present day, Ignis crosses paths with GUTS-Select on multiple occasions after an attempt on targeting Yuna. Despite his penchant for stealing and meddling with the team, he is willing to lend them his cooperation, especially if it means trying to get back at Hudram. He is well-aware of Kengo's double life as Trigger, but agreed with the youth to keep it to himself. After absorbing Trigger Dark's remains, Ignis eventually obtains the means of transforming into the Ultra through observation of Ribut's power. He is briefly put under GUTS-Select's arrest after his act jeopardized their mission in against Metsu-Orochi, but is freed during the events of Aboras and Banila's assault to assist Trigger. Despite his attempt to restore Planet Lishuria by kidnapping Yuna, he came to realize the bonds he formed with GUTS-Select and finally makes peace with his past tragedy by killing Hudram. After the Giants of Darkness are defeated, Ignis departs from Earth to look for another way to restore Lishuria.

While appearing similar to humans, his face glows the Lishurian's tribal markings if he gets excited. By stealing a GUTS Sparklence prototype from Akito, Ignis modify it into his own , using it with the corresponding Hyper Key to transform into Trigger Dark. Akito would later tweaked the Black Sparklence to provide Ignis with full control over Trigger Dark without the berserker tendencies.

Yuzare
When the Giants of Darkness razed the Ultra-Ancient civilization, Yuzare fought against their forces to prevent them from reaching the Eternity Core. She encountered a time-displaced Kengo and gave him the Ancient Sparklence that would connect him with Trigger Dark. Yuzare died after petrifying the recently-defected Trigger and the rest of the Giants of Darkness, but her spirit endured to the present day to lead Kengo to his merging with Trigger in Mars and occasionally conveying her messages to him. Yuzare's spirit took inhabitance within her descendant Yuna, as her growing powers turns them into an open target by the Giants of Darkness in the latter's quest for the Eternity Core. After Kengo returned from his time travel, she bestowed the youth with a piece of Eternity Core's power, allowing Kengo/Trigger to transform into Glitter Trigger Eternity.

As detailed in Ultraman Decker, Yuzare would return in the distant future as part of an intergalactic alliance against the invading Sphere forces. When Agams time traveled into the present era and Megalothor resurrecting itself through the Sphere's powers, Yuzare reached to Kengo on Mars to provide him with the Ultra Dual Sword, Trigger's set of Ultra Dimension Cards and the Sphere's Mons Dimension Card to bypass through their barrier on Earth.

Yuzare is portrayed by Runa Toyoda in a dual role with Yuna Shizuma, and is based on the similarly-named character in Ultraman Tiga.

Galaxy Rescue Force
The group's exploits are explored in the Galaxy Rescue Force Voice Drama miniseries. During the events of Ultra Galaxy Fight: The Destined Crossroad, Father of Ultra employs the help of Galaxy Rescue Force in Yullian's rescue operation in the height of Land of Light's war with the Absolutians.

Ultraman Ribut: See above
Sora: See below.
: A race of monster who served as guardians in planets with intelligent life forms. As more Gukulushisa keep disappearing one after another due to advancing civilizations, Queen Izana managed to find and inducted them as members of the Galaxy Rescue Force.
: The former leader of the Andro Defense Force, who had since retired to join the Galaxy Rescue Force under Queen Izana's offer, as well as entrusting his former position to the new recruit Andro Ares. After a mission with Ribut, Melos recounted the history of obtaining the Andro Melos alias to both Ribut and Sora.  reprises his voice role as Andro Melos.
: The queen of Planet Kanon at some point before Amate's ascension to the throne. According to Galaxy Rescue Force Voice Drama, she is not from Planet Kanon in the universe of Ultraman Orb: The Origin Saga.  reprises her voice role as Queen Izana.
: A member from Nebula KJ-K5 and an expert in running special covert missions. Originally a member of the race known as the Space Agent from episode 7 of Ultraman Max, Kenis came to disagree with his people's aggressive methods in blowing up warlike civilizations and deserted them in order to join the Galaxy Rescue Force.
: A member from Nebula Piccola who is friends with Piccolo from episode 46 of Ultraman Taro.
: Originally a Reionics from episode 4 of Ultra Galaxy Mega Monster Battle: Never Ending Odyssey, who had previously lost to Rei after challenging the human with Antlar. At some point after the end of Reionics Battle, RB acquired a Nova and used it to commit thievery in order to make ends meet. After his action was discovered by the Galaxy Rescue Force, Andro Melos offered RB to join the team out of pity, with Kenis taking the Babarue under his wing.
: A member of the Galaxy Rescue Force's Science Technology division. Actually a villain, he sought to use Sora to control the whole galaxy before being killed alongside his three monsters by the Galaxy Rescue Force members. He is voiced by You Murakami, his race first appearing in episode 28 of Ultraman.

Cosmo Beast Fighters

Practitioners of Cosmo Beast Fighters made their cameo in flashback scenes of The Destined Crossroad before their full appearance in Ultraman Regulos spin-off series. In addition, remains of the practitioners' powers are salvaged by Regulos in the form of energy orbs, which allows him and the Leo Brothers to utilize their combined powers in defeating Absolute Diavolo on Planet Blizzard.

: A bovine alien and the grandmaster of the Cosmo Beast Style, who took an amnesiac Regulos under the school's training. He was killed by Diavolo to obtain the Juggernaut Charging Buffalo Fist and the title of the grand master for his own, the latter of which is adopted by Regulos once Diavolo was defeated on Planet Blizzard.
: A white tiger-themed instructor with extreme dedication to the Cosmo Beast Style. He masters the Lightning White Tiger Fist, which grants him fulgurkinesis and represents the first half of Regulos' current powers.
: A draconic alien who, despite his carefree attitude, was an adept at accurately striking an opponent's weak spot. He masters the Flaming Red Dragon Fist, which grants him pyrokinesis and represents the other half of Regulos' current powers.
Remains of her power was used by Regulos in his confrontation against Diavolo on Planet Blizzard.
Remains of his power was used by Leo in his confrontation against Diavolo on Planet Blizzard.
Remains of his power was used by Astra in his confrontation against Diavolo on Planet Blizzard.
Absolute Diavolo: See here

Ultra Warriors

Ultraman Trigger
 is the titular Ultra of his eponymous series, who has a passing resemblance to Ultraman Tiga. 30 million years prior in the distant past, Trigger was once the fourth member of the Giant of Darkness, whose fighting strength surpasses his own peers, but a time-displaced Kengo managed to convince him to defect to the light. By joining forces with the Terran Protection Team, he helped banishing his former comrades to the edge of the universe before his petrified form laid to rest in an inverted pyramid on Mars.

His inner light was reincarnated into the present day as Kengo Manaka, who merges with the Ultra's petrified statue on Mars to resurrect him in the fight against his former comrades. Trigger would later be separated from his original form, Trigger Dark, when Kengo returned from the past and gaining an additional power from the Eternity Core. After defeating Megalothor, Trigger/Kengo merge with the Eternity Core to stabilize it. He would return two years later in Episode Z to fight against the rampaging monsters, Evil Trigger and the Celebro possessed-Ultraman Z. Alongside Kengo, Trigger returns to Earth during the events of Ultraman Decker in the middle of Sphere's campaign on Earth, using their Mons Dimension Card as a conduit. Meeting his successor Decker, the two fought against Sphere Megalothor and successfully rescued Carmeara, eventually leaving Earth once again with the dark Ultra in unison.

At the time of early defection from his teammates, Trigger splits into three separate figures that eventually become his Type Changes in the present day. In the same vein as Ultraman Tiga, Trigger assumes one of his preferable  forms per combat situations, with his Circle Arms also following in-suit: At some point during his decade-long departure, Trigger obtained the Ultra Dual Sword and is also capable of using it through its corresponding Hyper Key, before passing the weapon to his successor, Decker.

: Trigger's default red/purple-colored form, a balanced fighter who is capable of fighting in all forms of terrestrial areas.
: Trigger's red-colored form that focuses on brute strength and close combat.
: Trigger's light blue/purple-colored form that focuses on high speed and aerial combat.

Trigger's other forms include:
Trigger Dark: See below
: Trigger's strongest form, obtained as a result of Kengo receiving the Ultra-Ancient light and a piece of Eternity Core's energy. However, due to the form's massive power, it tends to exhaust Trigger quickly in the battle until Kengo receives a special training from Ribut. Kengo would later share the power of Glitter Trigger Eternity to Ignis/Trigger Dark during the latter's final confrontation with Hudram.
: Trigger's final form after temporarily reabsorbing his splintered Trigger Dark half in the fight against Carmeara, in addition to an energy boost from the Eternity Core itself.

His vocal grunts are provided by Raiga Terasaka, who is also the actor of Kengo Manaka. Raiga also portrayed Trigger's mental image in episode 12 after revealing himself as Kengo's previous incarnation.

Trigger Dark
 is Ultraman Trigger's black-colored original form during his early days as a member of the Giants of Darkness. The form was lost after a time-displaced Kengo established contact with Trigger to thwart his former comrades from exploiting the Eternity Core, followed by his petrifaction by Yuzare.

In the present day, Carmeara uses her spell to corrupt Trigger's husk back to his original form. By the time Kengo returned from his time-displaced trip, Trigger Dark exists as a separate being who is driven to destroy everything on sight; including his former companions and is forced to be defeated by Glitter Trigger Eternity. The dark Ultra survived by having his essence absorbed into Ignis and the treasure hunter acquiring his own means of transforming into Trigger Dark. Despite his merger, Ignis initially has no real control due to Trigger Dark's berserker tendencies feeding his grudge against Hudram, until Akito tweaked the Black Sparklence to negate its side effects. After Hudram's death, Trigger Dark's power is temporarily fused with Ultraman Trigger to form Trigger Truth in order to put an end to Megalothor's reign of terror.

In combat, Trigger Dark can also harness the power of past monsters through the use of their Monster Keys and wielding the original Trigger's Circle Arms.

: Grants Trigger Dark the ability to conjure energy spikes and brute strength akin to Power Type.
: Grants Trigger Dark the ability to conjure lightning bolts and super speed akin to Sky Type.

Following his merger with Ignis, Trigger Dark's vocal grunts are provided by the latter's actor, Kei Hosogai. He is the reinterpretation of Tiga Dark from Ultraman Tiga: The Final Odyssey.

Ultraman Decker
 is the titular Ultra of his eponymous series, who has a passing resemblance to Ultraman Dyna. Decker's true identity is the form of his human namesake who fights against the invading Spheres alongside a group of resistance forces, some of which includes a future Yuzare. When Agams went rogue and brings the Sphere to the past with him, Decker is unable to chase the alien and can only pass his Ultraman powers to his ancestor, Kanata Asumi, in order to fight against the threat of Sphere. The Ultra remains fighting with Kanata until the destruction of the Mother Spheresaurus has him parting ways with the young boy.

Through his human host, Decker is capable of assuming Type Changes to access three forms that suit his combat situations. With the Ultra Dimension Cards accessed by Kanata, Decker can also utilize specific one-time support attacks during his battles.

: Decker's default form that is balanced in terms of fighting style and ranged beam attacks.
: A brutish red colored form with emphasis for brute strength and close combat.
: A blue colored form that specializes in psychokinesis and splitting into three separate clones.
: Decker's strongest form, which grants him the use of  that can function as both a double-edged sword and a shield.

His grunts are provided by Hiroki Matsumoto, Kanata's actor. Meanwhile, the voice of Decker in Kanata's flashback of episode 15 is provided by Masashi Taniguchi, who also portrays the Ultra's human namesake.

Ultraman Dinas
 is the purple Ultra who appears exclusively in Ultraman Decker Finale: Journey to Beyond. His true identity is Ultraman Decker at an incomplete state, who was born from the female Lavian of the same name when Ultraman Dyna resurrects her through his power. Together, the two Ultras fought against the invading forces of aliens on Planet Lavie before Dyna left for parts unknown, while Dinas and his host namesake traces Gibellus' forces all the way to Earth wherein the two join forces with GUTS-Select members. Dinas teams up Terraphaser to fight against Zor-Gigalogaiser but both of them were defeated. Dinas is then evolved into Decker when the Lavian namesake and the rest of the GUTS-Select members use their power of bonds to resurrect Kanata from his death, resulting in Decker's return to Earth to finally destroy Gigalogaiser.

Because of the Lavian's peaceful nature as a whole, Dinas is not a proficient fighter but compensates it using his ability to harness the powers of monsters through the Mons Dimension Cards.

Ultraman Dinas is voiced by Kayano Nakamura, who also portrays his human host of the same name.

Other Ultra Warriors
: A peacekeeping organization in the Land of Light that was established after Alien Empera's defeat and his army retreating from Nebula M78.
: The top commander of the Inter-Galactic Defense Force. He issues the war with Absolutians after the latter race kidnapped Yullian as a hostage.  and Alexander Hunter reprise their voice role as Father of Ultra in Japanese and English dub of The Destined Crossroad, respectively.
: The Father of Ultra's wife.  and Hannah Grace reprise their voice role as Mother of Ultra in Japanese and English dub of The Destined Crossroad, respectively.
: A division of 11 Ultras known for their contribution on a different planet Earth.
: The Commander of the Inter-Galactic Defense Force and the leader of Ultra Brothers. Under Ultraman King's advise, Zoffy and Taro brought along the Leo Brothers in an attempt to stop the ensuing war between Ultras and Absolutians.  and Ryan Drees reprise their voice role as Zoffy in Japanese and English dub of The Destined Crossroad, respectively.
: See here.
: See here.
: See here.
: See here.
: An Ultra who serves Ultraman King as the former's right hand man. Alongside Astra, Leo joins Zoffy and Taro to stop the ensuing war between the Ultras and Absolutians.
: Leo's younger twin brother that makes up the second member of the Leo Brothers duo.
: See here.
: A blue-colored Ultra and Mebius' partner during their time on Earth.  and Chris Wells reprise their voice role as Ultraman Hikari in Japanese and English dub of The Destined Crossroad, respectively.
: The royal princess from the Land of Light, who is currently imprisoned in Narak by The Kingdom as a bargaining chip against her home world. Yullian met Regulos in her prison and recognizes his affiliation to the Cosmo Beast Fist.  and Hannah Grace reprise their voice role as Yullian in Japanese and English dub of The Destined Crossroad, respectively.
: A member of the Elite Task Force. Neos appeared in Galaxy Rescue Force Voice Drama to assist Ribut and Melos in their fight against a Bemstar, later mentioning his past association to GRF for volunteering to be Gukuru Shisa's sparring partner, leading to the two bonding together and the Ultra learning to understand the meaning of its growls.  reprises his voice role as Ultraman Neos.
: Neos' partner and a member of the Galactic Security Agency. Seven 21 appeared in Galaxy Rescue Force Voice Drama.  reprises his voice role as Ultraseven 21.
: Ultraman Max's partner and a fellow Civilization Guardian. Xenon appeared in Galaxy Rescue Force Voice Drama.  and Iain reprise their voice role as Ultraman Xenon in both Japanese and English dub.
: See here.
: An elderly Ultra warrior residing in Planet King. After hearing Zoffy and Taro's report of the ensuing fight between Ultras and Absolutians, King sent down the Leo Brothers to accompany the former two in stopping the upcoming conflict between two races.  reprises his voice role as Ultraman King since Ultraman Geed, while Charles Grover voiced the character in English dub.
: The strongest warrior in Planet U40. Joneus appeared in Galaxy Rescue Force Voice Drama to meet with Queen Izana and later on solving an Alien Valky's issue with his pet Samekujira. In The Destined Crossroad, Joneus is tasked with training the new rookies of Inter-Galactic Defense Force and took Zero under his wing.  reprises his voice role as Ultraman Joneus, with Ryan Drees doing the same in the English dub of The Destined Crossroad.
: A trio of Ultras from Planet Altara of Nebula M78 who debuted in the 1987 animation film Ultraman: The Adventure Begins. In The Destined Crossroad, the trio are assigned by Zoffy to guard the slumbering Ultraman Noa on Planet Babel from Absolute Titan's invasion.
: A fastidious Ultra from Land of Bright, who became fast friends with Nice, Boy and Grigio after a sparring match in the Ultra Colosseum. He is voiced by You Murakami in Japanese and by Robert Baldwin in English respectively.
: See here.
: Tiga's successor from the Neo Frontier era, who manifested through Ultraman Z Gamma Future's Gamma Illusion to fight against a troop of Legionoids in The Destined Crossroad. In the distant future of Ultraman Decker, Dyna is part of the alliance formed by mankind to fight against the invading Sphere forces. He jumped into the present day when Sphere-Geomos used its powers to bring several Spheresaurus from the future, inadvertently bringing Dyna as well. Dyna joins forces with the Kanata/the present-day Decker and provides him with the cards of his and Tiga's powers. Before leaving, Dyna reassures Kanata that the future is not set in stone, countering Agams' retorts of blaming mankind for Planet Bazdo's fall.
: An Ultra who represents the Gaia hypothesis. He is manifested alongside Tiga and Dyna through Z Gamma Future's Gamma Illusion to fight a troop of Darklops and Legionoids.
: An Ultra from TOY 1, a neighboring planet in the Nebula M78. While sparring with Zearth to participate in Yullian's rescue mission, he became fast friends with Boy and Grigio.
: A Land of Light Ultra whose age is the equivalent of an elementary school student. As with his debut from Ultraman Boy's Ultra Colosseum, Boy's crush on Yullian prompts him to train alongside Zearth and Nice in hopes of participating in Yullian's rescue mission, eventually the three finding themselves befriending Grigio.
: A pacifistic Ultra who is hunted down by the Absolutians due to his role in fusing into either Ultraman Legend or Ultraman Saga. In Planet Juran, Cosmos was able to destroy the Absolutian invaders despite Lidorias' role as a hostage.  and Peter von Gomm reprise their voice role as Ultraman Cosmos in Japanese and English dub of The Destined Crossroad, respectively.
: A representative of Universal Justice. Justice went to meet with Queen Izana in Galaxy Rescue Force Voice Drama, following Tartarus' attack in chapter 1 of The Absolute Conspiracy.  reprises her voice role as Ultraman Justice.
: See here.
: A scientist from the Land of Light. Alongside her childhood friend Ribut, events from their early days in GRF are presented in the Galaxy Rescue Force Voice Drama. Megumi Han reprised her voice role as Sora, while Rumiko Varnes voiced her in The Destined Crossroads English dub.
: A team of Ultra Warriors starting from Ultraman Ginga to Ultraman Z. Excluding Ultraman Z, eleven members had the ability to fuse together into .
: The fusion of Ginga and Victory. 
: An Ultraman who came from future.  and Peter von Gomm reprise their voice role as Ultraman Ginga in the Japanese and English dub respectively.
: Ginga's partner from Victorian.  and Michael Jose Rivas-Micoud reprise their voice role as Ultraman Victory in Japanese and English dub respectively.
:  and Mark Stein reprise their voice role as Ultraman X in Japanese and English dub respectively.
:  and Chris Wells reprise their voice role as Ultraman Orb in Japanese and English dub respectively.
:  and Dario Toda reprise their voice role as Ultraman Geed in Japanese and English dub respectively.
: The fusion of Rosso and Blu.
:  and Jeff Manning reprise their voice role as Ultraman Rosso in the Japanese and English dub respectively.
:  and Ryan Drees reprise their voice role as Ultraman Blu in Japanese and English dub respectively.
: Rosso and Blu's younger sister.  and Rumiko Varnes reprise their voice role as Ultrawoman Grigio in Japanese and English dub of The Destined Crossroad, respectively.
: A group of three Ultra Warriors from Ultraman Taiga. Following Yullian's capture from the events of The Absolute Conspiracy, the Tri-Squad are assigned to reform the Ultra League by recruiting more members into their alliance, with the entirety of New Generation Heroes as their first candidates. 
: The son of Ultraman Taro and the Tri-Squad's team leader.  and Matthew Masaru Barron reprise their voice role as Ultraman Taiga in Japanese and English dub of The Destined Crossroad, respectively.
: A U40 Ultra Warrior with emphasis of brute strength.  and Jeff Manning reprise their voice role as Ultraman Titas in Japanese and English dub respectively.
: An Ultra from Planet O-50 using speed and stealth techniques.  and Chris Wells reprise their voice role as Ultraman Fuma in Japanese and English dub respectively.
: A rookie member of the Inter-Galactic Defense Force who embarked in various interplanetary rescue missions after the events of Civilization Self-Destruction Game. In The Destined Crossroad, Z and Haruki briefly separated, with the former participating with the rest of the New Generation Heroes in their hunt against the Devil Splinters and eventually finding themselves dragged into the crossfire between the Land of Light and The Kingdom. Through Beliarok and his bond with Haruki, Z is able to access  as a temporary empowerment in against a Parallel Isotope Belial. In Ultraman Trigger: New Generation Tiga, Z ended up on Kengo's Earth after a chase against Alien Barossa IV to reclaim the stolen King Joe SC, joining forces with GUTS Select and Ultraman Trigger to fight against the alien pirate and the Dada threat before being forced to return to his home dimension. Two years later in Ultraman Trigger: Episode Z, Haruki and Z returns to Kengo's Earth in their hunt for the fugitive Celebro. Z regains control of his body once Haruki expelled the parasite through Haruki's resolve and Kengo's support.  reprises his voice role as Ultraman Z, with Peter von Gomm reprising his role as the character in the English dub of The Destined Crossroad.
: Ultraman Z's human host, who decided to accompany Z in his outer space missions after the events of Civilization Self-Destruction Game, effectively forcing him to part ways with STORAGE as a whole. Haruki was absent during the events of The Destined Crossroad, as he participated in the rebuilding of an alien planet. In Ultraman Trigger: New Generation Tiga, Haruki ended up on Kengo's Earth during a chase against Alien Barossa IV to reclaim the stolen King Joe SC. With his Z Riser being fixed, he used the GUTS Sparklence and GUTS Hyper Keys as his alternative to transform into Z and any of the latter's forms. After fighting against Dada, Haruki entrusted Akito with fixing his Z Riser while being forced to return King Joe SC's remains back to his world. In Episode Z, Haruki had his Z Riser fixed and returned to Kengo's world to recapture Celebro, only to ended up getting possessed by the creature. After expelling the parasite with Kengo's help, Haruki/Z returns to support both Triggers in against Evil Trigger before returning to his home planet when Himari recaptured Celebro in aftermath from the fight. In The Destined Crossroad, Haruki temporarily separated himself from Z due to his participation in a different planet.  reprises his role as Haruki Natsukawa.
: A sentient weapon and clone of Ultraman Belial who serves as Ultraman Z's sidearm weapon despite his neutral affiliation. During the events of The Destined Crossroad, Beliarok allows himself to be used by Geed and a Parallel Belial, eventually returning to Z after through observation of the latter's behavior. In Trigger, Bullton's power caused him to be parted with his user and reunited in the middle of Barossa IV's fight with Z, Trigger and GUTS-Select on Kengo's Earth.  reprises his voice role as Beliarok, while the English dub of The Destined Crossroad features Jack Merluzzi as his voice actor in a dual role with the Parallel Isotope Belial.

Antagonists

Giants of Darkness
Originally consisting of four warriors, their strongest member, Trigger Dark, defected to support the Terran Protection Team and banished their petrified forms to the opposite ends of the universe. Once all three of them are reawakened and reunited in the present day, the trio made multiple attempts in facing against Kengo and his comrades, either through their sheer strength or the ability to command monsters under their will. Following their failed attempts at getting Trigger back to their side and Kyrieloid placing them under his trance, the team starts to dwindle as Hudram left on his own accord, followed by Darrgon once Carmeara begins to lose grip on her sanity, eventually leaving her as the sole survivor once absorbing their leftover darknesses.

The trio is based on the similarly named team from Ultraman Tiga: The Final Odyssey. This decision is done due to Ultraman Tiga's past association with his former allies, hence the three giants in Trigger having past association to the titular Ultra as well.

Carmeara
 is the gold-colored leader of the Giants of Darkness. Originally in the distant past, she was once Trigger Dark's lover and is scorned over her former lover's defection. In addition to her mission in targeting Yuna/Yuzare for the access to Eternity Core, Carmeara extended her rivalry to Kengo after discovering the youth's involvement in Trigger's defection and for obtaining the Eternity Core. As the series progresses, Carmeara's mental health starts to take its toll as she absorbs Hudram and Darrgon for their attempts in deserting her and finally transforms into Megalothor after gaining access to the Eternity Core, eventually dying in Trigger's arms following Megalothor's destruction once she learns to appreciate the light. A decade later in Ultraman Decker, Carmeara is simultaneously resurrected through Megalothor's assimilation with the Spheres. Through Decker and Yuzare's help, she escapes from the monster and join forces with the Ultra to destroy it before joining Kengo/Trigger in departing from Earth, hoping to find a place where she could lay the spirits of Darrgon and Hudram to rest.

She can also assume a human disguise while retaining her original powers at a smaller rate.

She is the reinterpretation of Camearra from Ultraman Tiga: The Final Odyssey, with Koichi Sakamoto noting that his wife (Motoko Nagino) used to be the suit actress of the dark Ultra and saw her as a source of inspiration, hence being particular to the former character.

Darrgon
 is the red-colored and armored Giant of Darkness who finds enjoyment in fighting, especially in against those he considered as worthy opponents. Darrgon was awakened in the present day by Carmeara to challenge Trigger on Earth after Gymaira's destruction and resumed his team's original goal once Hudram rejoined them. Although his team's main mission is to target Yuna/Yuzare for the location of Eternity Core, Darrgon finds himself conflicted with his mission after his growing feelings for Yuna and his newfound respect for mankind as a whole. Seeing how his group became disjointed from Hudram's treachery and Carmeara's descent into madness, Darrgon attempts to quit, but was brainwashed into fighting against Trigger and hunting Yuna. He was later given a mercy kill by Akito via the Nursedessei, with his essence absorbed by Carmeara as part of her transformation into Megalothor.

Because of his thirst for battle, Darrgon is a straightforward person who prefers fair fight and detests cheating. In battle, Darrgon emphasizes the use of brute strength as his sole weapon.

He is the reinterpretation of Darramb from Ultraman Tiga: The Final Odyssey.

Hudram
 is the blue-colored Giant of Darkness who served as the team's combat strategist, using various forms of tricks while having a hidden brutal side. Although he is the last to appear on Earth, Hudram was awakened at a century earlier than his peers and destroyed multiple planets out of boredom, including Ignis' home planet Lishuria. At some point after Darrgon's reawakening, Hudram targeted Yuna in order to draw out Yuzare's spirit and even enlisted Gazort to his aid, only to be dragged out of the battle by his peers to keep his temper in check. Seeing Carmeara's inability to move past her love for Trigger, Hudram left his companions to act on his own after his failed attempt at usurping control from his former leader. While attempting to harness the Eternity Core for his own ends, he is defeated by Ignis/Trigger Dark and killed once his remains are absorbed by Carmeara to assume Megalothor.

As Hudram is physically weak, he makes it up through his cunning wits and reliance on deception.

He is the reinterpretation of Hudra from Ultraman Tiga: The Final Odyssey.

The Kingdom
 is an organization that first appeared in Ultra Galaxy Fight: The Absolute Conspiracy. Despite the energy's massive strength, their inability to control it leads to a slow destruction of their home world, hence their necessity to take the Land of Light as their replacement planet and eventually leading to their upcoming war with the latter planet's Ultras. After losing Yullian as their hostage and suffering from a massive lost during both parties' fight on Planet Blizzard, The Kingdom temporarily ceases their war against the Land of Light and resort to covert operations.

Absolute Tartarus
First appearing in The Absolute Conspiracy,  is The Kingdom's strategist who has the ability to use the dimensional pocket Narak as his means of transportation. As the de jure leader of the team, Tartarus answers to an unseen ruler, who the Absolutians refer to as their lord.

Exactly after the events The Absolute Conspiracy, Tartarus continues to strengthen The Kingdom's forces while crippling any threats that may pose as potential allies to the Ultras. After failing to prevent the Ultras from rescuing Yullian and losing a majority of his forces, he attempts to obliterate the Ultras on Planet Blizzard, but the intervention of Ultraman King caused him, Diavolo and Ribut to be dragged into a black hole to the world where events of Ultraman Trigger is taking place. Tartarus initially hatched a plan to acquire the Eternity Core's power for The Kingdom's use, but Diavolo's defeat and Ribut's meddling forced him to abandon the idea and resuming his war with the Ultras.

 and Walter Roberts reprise their voice role as Absolute Tartarus in Japanese and English dub respectively.

Absolute Diavolo
 is a member of the Absolutian race who is trained in the ways of Cosmo Beast Style, inheriting the Buffalo Style after killing Master Alude and capturing Ultraman Regulos in the height of Alien Magma's attack on Planet D60.

When a convoy of Ultras storm the Absolutians' home planet and freed their captives, Diavolo fought against Regulos and is defeated when the Ultra and the Leo Brothers combine the powers of Cosmo Beast Style against the former. Diavolo's heart was later dragged alongside Tartarus and Ribut into a black hole and transported to the world where events of Ultraman Trigger taking place. Intending to fulfill Tartarus' plan in harnessing the Eternity Core, a resurrected Diavolo fought and almost succeeded by draining it from Glitter Trigger Eternity before Ribut interfered in the former's operation. His energies were stolen by GUTS-Select to activate Nursedessei's Battle Mode and was defeated again by the former team and both Ultras' combined attacks. Tartarus revived him once more, forcing The Kingdom to abandon their operation on Earth.

Being an Absolutian, Diavolo has the same powerset and as strong as Tartarus. Upon destruction, Diavolo can regenerate himself for as long as his  remains intact.

Absolute Titan
 is an Absolutian swordsman and a cold-hearted assassin whose philosophy as an honored warrior often puts him at odds with Diavolo.

Despite Noa's conviction for the Ultras and Absolutians to form a truce, a rhetoric that is repeated in his confrontation with Ribut on Planet Blizzard, Titan rejected it under The Kingdom's need for his race to survive and postponing their fight out of frustration.

In the English dub, he is voiced by Bob Werley in prologue and Douglas Kirk in subsequent episodes.

Servants of The Kingdom
: A monster from Ultraman Orb The Movie, which Tartarus acquired and modified by Alien Bat for The Kingdom's usage. In episode 14 of Trigger, it was used by Diavolo to force the titular Ultra into harnessing the Eternity Core's power. The monster was bisected by Glitter Trigger Eternity's Eternity Zerades.
: GAFJ's fourth SC unit, which Tartarus acquired alongside Darebolic and modified by Alien Bat into an autonomous combatant. The SC unit was utilized by Tartarus on Planet Babel to fight against Nexus and destroyed by Ultraman Noa's Lightning Noa. First appeared in episode 22 of Ultraman Z.
: The major antagonist of Ultra Fight Orb. Arriving in the Monster Graveyard, he empowers himself with four Devil Splinters that allows him to recreate the Giga Battlenizer, but later on dies from the feedback.
: See here.
: See here.
: The resurrected villain from the events of Ultraman Saga under the service of The Kingdom, modifying Darebolic and Ultroid Zero for their personal usage. During Tartarus' hunt for the Devil Splinters, he arrived in the Monster Graveyard and created Grigio Darkness from his study of Ultra Dark-Killer. He participated in the fight against New Generation Heroes and is killed by Ultraman Taiga Tri-Strium Rainbow.
: A leader of the Gua Army who lost her life when the army collapsed after her brothers, Juda and Mold, were kidnapped during the events of The Absolute Conspiracy. In The Destined Crossroad, she was resurrected by Reibatos and seeks to revive her fallen brothers, joining The Kingdom through a deal with Tartarus. Gina assisted them in retrieving the Devil Splinters, but is later forced by Reibatos to fuse with the spirits of her brothers into Gua Spectre. After Gua's defeat, Gina disappears as her revival is approaching its limit, nonetheless thanking Grigio for their encounter. Previously appearing as a human form in episodes 10-12 of Ultraman X, The Destined Crossroad is Gina Spectre's first appearance in her true form.
: The combined form of the three Gua siblings, which Reibatos created by infusing the spirits of Mold and Juda into Gina against her will. The fusion is defeated by Ultraman Reiga's Reiga Ultimate Blaster, reducing it to Gina before her passing to the afterlife. Instead of appearing similar to Mold Spectre from episode 15 of Ultraman X, Gua Spectre appeared as a white version of the former with Juda and Gina's faces as shoulder armors.
: A Darkness Warrior created by Alien Bat by fusing Grigio's stolen light energy with the Killer Plasma, through his study of Ultra Dark-Killer's ability to do so in the past. Grigio Darkness fought against her counterpart, followed by Ultraman Nice, Zearth and Boy as the three distracted her to lift the original Grigio's spirit. Grigio Darkness was killed in a futile attempt to fire her  against Grigio's Grigio Shot. First appearing in Ultra Heroes Expo 2021 stage show, her voice role is reprised by Arisa Sonohara in a dual role with the real Grigio.
: A cyborg Alien Baltan under Gua Army's employment from Andro Melos. Gua Spectre summoned it alongside Cyber Mecha Baltan to fight off Ultraman Z and was killed by the Beliarok's Deathcium Slash.
: An enhanced version of Mecha Baltan from the events of Ultraman Festival 2016. Gua Spectre summoned it alongside Mecha Baltan to fight off Ultraman Z and was killed by the Beliarok's Deathcium Slash.

Megalothor
 is Carmeara's monster form in Ultraman Trigger: New Generation Tiga that she created by absorbing her comrades' essence and tapping into the Eternity Core's power in the process. In its initial fight with both Trigger and Trigger Dark, Megalothor absorbed their attacks to empower itself, eventually evolving to its second form within three days. Guided by Carmeara's resentment towards Kengo/Trigger, Megalothor chases after him in Nursedessei and eventually defeated when Kengo transforms into Trigger Truth to tap into the power of Eternity Core. A decade later in Ultraman Decker, remnants of Megalothor's darkness merged with the Spheres to resurrect itself, subverting their will and resumes its rampaging spree by fighting Decker and the returned Trigger. With Carmeara purged out of the monster, Megalothor is rendered its own entity and is destroyed by the Ultras' combined forces.

Throughout its appearance, Megalothor changes forms through its ability of absorption:
: Megalothor's default form, resembling Demonthor from Ultraman Tiga: The Final Odyssey.
: Megalothor's evolved form, resulted from absorbing Glitter Trigger Eternity and Trigger Dark's Zeperion Beams.
: Megalothor's resurrected form, obtained through its assimilation with the Spheres while at the same time subverting their will to become independent. It retains most of its original attacks while gaining the Spheres' ability to emit shockwave and creating barrier.

Rylar
 is a cult that worships the Ultra Ancient Civilization and the antagonist faction of Ultraman Trigger: Episode Z. Preaching the concept of light itself, they desire said power in order to reshape the world to their own image and has intruded multiple ancient ruins after sensing Kengo's plight. Initially cooperating with GUTS-Select to revive Kengo, they later allied with Celebro to steal the powers of Ultraman Trigger for Zabil to become Evil Trigger. Aside from Rylar Ibra, the rest of the cultists were killed after being absorbed by Zabil to facilitate the Evil Trigger transformation.

Zabil/Evil Trigger
 is the true leader of Rylar and the main antagonist of Episode Z. Hailing from 30 million years prior during the Giants of Darkness' invasion on Earth, Zabil was once a member of the Terran Protection Team who fought alongside Yuzare as the team's scientist in against their invaders. When Yuzare sacrificed herself to empower the recently-defected Ultraman Trigger, he fell into despair after assuming that all of his comrades' sacrifice were in vain. He and his cultists also witnessed the exploits of Kengo/Trigger and the latter's sacrifice to stabilize the Eternity Core.

Within the intervening two years, he replaces Tatsumi as GUTS-Select's new captain to fight against the increasing number of monster attacks. Once Kengo has been revived and lost his powers as Trigger, Zabil drops the ruse and has his cultists facilitate his transformation into Evil Trigger, intending to use his newfound powers in leading mankind and ensuring peace with his own terms. The destruction of Evil Trigger resulted with Zabil spending his last breath seeing Yuzare's image in Yuna before passing on to the afterlife.

Zabil transforms into , a white-colored artificial Ultraman in Trigger's image, through the Ancient Sparklence and his fellow cultists as sacrifices with the original Trigger's powers as a conduit. Other than his finisher being , Evil Trigger can utilize  to grow into gigantic proportions by absorbing Ultraman Trigger's powers.

Evil Trigger is based on Evil Tiga from Ultraman Tiga.

Rylar Ibra
 is the acting figurehead of Rylar during Zabil's infiltration into TPU and is one of Celebro's willing host. He owns a capsule which serves as a beacon to manipulate monsters into his liking, as in with Pagos, Gazort, Deathdrago and Genegarg. After leading the cultists into assisting GUTS-Select in saving Kengo from the Eternity Core, Ibra escaped from his captivity and helps with collecting the scattered powers of Ultraman Trigger's Hyper Key under Zabil's orders. Ibra was spared from being a sacrifice, but was forced to be used by Celebro as its medium in summoning Destrudos to assist Zabil/Evil Trigger in against the Ultras. Following Destrudos' destruction and Celebro's recapture, Ibra's fate remains unknown.

Celebro/Destrudos
 is an alien creature and the antagonist of Ultraman Z who escaped from STORAGE's captivity at some point of time. Initially jumping from one cultist to another, Celebro then possesses Haruki and took control of Ultraman Z to fight against GUTS-Select and Ignis/Trigger Dark. In the middle of supporting Zabil/Evil Trigger, Kengo manages to help Haruki in expelling the alien parasite, forcing it to inhabit Ibra to transform into Destrudos until it was defeated by the three Ultras. Celebro was later recaptured by Himari, allowing Haruki to return the creature to STORAGE in his home world.

Sphere
 are the antagonist of Ultraman Decker, who previously appeared in Ultraman Dyna. The Spheres were originally creatures from the distant future who seek to assimilate lifeforms on planets with advanced civilizations. Their method of assimilation involves scouts forming a  around a targeted planet, enhancing the barrier by absorbing the planet's energy before Mother Sphere arrives to complete the process. Their presence triggers an alliance between mankind and various alien civilizations to fight back, some of which include the future Yuzare, people of Planet Bazdor, Ultraman Decker and Ultraman Dyna. When Agams defected to the Spheres and time travels to the past, the Spheres follow him in-suit to the Earth 7 years after Episode Z. After isolating Earth from rest of the solar system. the Sphere attempt to and siphon Earth's energy to gradually consume the planet.

With Agams/Terraphaser's cooperation, the Spheres achieved their objective and thus summoning Mother Spheresaurus to Earth in harnessing the power of Eternity Core for its own use. The Spheres are later destroyed when Mother Spheresaurus is killed by Ultraman Decker, freeing any planet under their grasp (both the present day and the future).

: A twin-conjoined saucer-like form which act as carriers of the smaller Sphere fleet. Five of them are deployed to different countries across the globe to form the Sphere Barrier during their first invasion on Earth.
: Lesser versions of the Spheres, deployed as invasion troops and can infect monsters to create Sphere Synthetic Monsters. A Mons Dimension Card of the Sphere Soldiers is under Kengo's possession, which Akito enhances to grant Trigger the ability to pass through the Sphere Barrier.
: A monster that an aggregated form of the Sphere Soldiers, its purpose to absorb an invaded world's energy to empower the Sphere Barrier until it shrinks to the point where the Spheres are able to assimilate the planet before Mother Spheresaurus appears. The first Spheresaurus forms in Sorafune City where it unleashes an EMP shockwave that disables autopiloted GUTS Falcon and Nursedessei, only to be destroyed by Decker's Selgend Beam. A year later, another Spheresaurus is created with Sphere-Neomegas's regenerative abilities to enhancing the Sphere Barrier with support from Agams/Terraphaser before being swiftly destroyed by Decker after the Ultra acquires Dynamic Type. Spheresaurus were last seen during Sphere-Geomos' reign of terror, as they arrived from the future to reinforce the Sphere Barrier. The first one was killed by Nursedessei's S-Plasma-enhanced Nurse Cannon, while the second breed was killed by Ultraman Dyna upon arrival.
: A trio of giant pillars formed by the Sphere Soldiers to drain the Earth of its energy and redirect it to empower the Sphere Barrier. Upon empowerment by the Sphere Soldiers, Terraphaser creates them to call forth Mother Spheresaurus while at the same time resurrecting Sphere-Gomora, Sphere-Red King and Sphere-Neomegas as guardians against Ultraman Decker's assault.

Mother Sphere
 is the progenitor of the Spheres who is also their main body and exists by transcending time and space. When Agams facilitate the Sphere invasion in the present day Earth and assists the Sphere Soldiers' attempt at enhancing the barrier surrounding the planet, Mother Sphere appears and contemplates to absorb the Eternity Core for herself. Having killed Agams when he tried to redeem himself, she fights against the combined forces of the Ultras and GUTS-Select and briefly assimilating them into her own being. However her targets escape after refusing to discard their free will, targeting her energy core for Decker to deliver the finishing blow. With Mother Spheresaurus' death, the Spheres ceased to exist.

As Mother Spheresaurus, her main ability is to fire an energy beam from the core on its chest and using the crystals on her body to fire multitudes of light beams. Her ability to transcends time and space allows her to traverse between different periods of time and accessing the Eternity Core despite its entrance was sealed prior to the series.

Agams the Bazdor
 is an alien who poses as the scientist named  from TPU's technology division and is a supporting antagonist in Ultraman Decker.

From , Agams and his people are one of the many resistance forces who fought against the invading Spheres, but after losing his wife Laelia and seeing his planet doomed to be assimilated, Agams came to the conclusion that the creatures' attack on civilized planets are inevitable, coupled with blaming mankind for all the mess that happened and Decker in particular. To that end, he time travels to the farthest in Earth's past and works under TPU to create Terraphaser. As "Asakage", Agams develops new armaments for them and regularly comes to Nursedessei to deliver said items, as well as guiding them in the use of their mechs during battle. Agams' ambition is put to a temporary stop when Kanata wields the power of Decker Dynamic Type and destroys both Spheresaurus and Terraphaser, leaving Agams on the run from TPU authorities. After helping the Spheres reaching their objective, Agams eventually redeem himself when Kanata reminds him of Laelia's wish, with her spirit visiting him as well. Having freed the Earth from the Sphere Barrier, Agams dies when Mother Spheresaurus opens fire on Terraphaser's cockpit. He was last seen with Laelia's spirit, watching Kanata after his success in repelling the Sphere invasion before the couple passes on to the afterlife.

It also allows him to access the Mons Dimension Cards as part of strengthening the robot.

Professor Gibellus
 is the main antagonist of Ultraman Decker Finale: Journey to Beyond. Piloting the experimental site/mobile fortress  with an alien army under his lead, Gibellus aims to rule the skies over Earth while finding himself opposed by GUTS-Select and Dinas.

Professor Gibellus can transform into  that can also combine with Zorgaus to become .

Magma Invasion Army
 are an army of Alien Magma who serves as antagonists to Ultraman Regulos. The army launched their attack on Planets L77 and D60, setting forth the events of Ultraman Leo and contributing to Regulos' capture in Ultra Galaxy Fight: The Destined Crossroad.

Volcan
 is the commander that leads the Magma Invasion Army in against Planets L77 and D60.

Volcan has the ability to turn his malice into poison, attacking enemies with his . He also wears an armor which was copied from Alien Empera's Armored Darkness, granting him protection despite being inferior to the original model.

Yurub
 is the captain of the Magma Invasion Army that attacks Planet D60, setting his forces against the Cosmo Beast Fighters. Other than participating in the front lines, Yurub's cruelty in the battlefield is tempered by his compassion to his younger sister.

Yurub is voiced by Koichi Toshima, who previously portrayed an Alien Magma in Secret Origins of the Nursedessei.

Lava
 is the vice-captain of the Magma Invasion Army, as well as Yurub's subordinate and his younger sister. She fights using a pair of short swords and her speed to create combo attacks.

Lava is voiced by Meiku Harukawa.

Minor characters
Ultraman Trigger
: The 49 year old worker of Sizuma Foundation who is the leading archaeologist in exploring Trigger's resting place on Mars. 20 years prior to the series, Reina discovered an infant Kengo nearby Trigger's statue and adopted the boy as her own son, having well aware of his true nature prior to the ancient Ultra's resurrection.
: STORAGE's ace pilot, who boarded the Space Sevenger in an attempt to assist Ultraman Z in recovering King Joe SC from Alien Barossa IV.  reprises her voice role as Yoko Nakashima.
: Mitsukuni's wife and Yuna's mother, who was also a descendant of Yuzare's bloodline. Yurika was the person who guided young Mitsukuni during his arrival from the Neo Frontier universe and helped familiarizing him with the universe he was stranded in. Yurika died at some point after Yuna's birth, leaving Mitsukuni to raise and protect their daughter in the former's absence.

Secret Origins of the Nursedessei
: Hotta's wife and a full-time housewife. A former TPU ace pilot, she is occasionally brought in as a temporary instructor. She recommended that Tatsumi recruits Himari into GUTS-Select.

Ultraman Decker
: Kanata's grandfather, who gave the former his blessing to join TPU after the events of Sphere's invasion.
 and : Kanata's parents, who went to Mars around the same time when the Sphere invasion took place, forcing them to be separated from Kanata and Daishiro. While taking refuge under the former GUTS-Select members' protection, Kengo took the time to reveal the Asumi couple of their son's exploits on Earth and the two agree to deliver a recorded message to their, congratulating him on his participation as a GUTS-Select member.
: Kaizaki's mentor and a former chief of TPU's Monster Research Lab. Having discovered the buried remains of a monster, Shigenaga plans to create Neomegas as an alternative to the Ultras, but was fired from her position in TPU after Kaizaki discovered her plans. Up until the present day, Shigenaga works with underground sponsors to create Neomegas and was arrested after her monster's destruction.
: The descendant of Kanata who joins the fight against the Sphere forces as Ultraman Decker. However as a result of Agams' time travel machinations threatening the future of Earth, Decker is forced to surrender his powers to Kanata, bidding his time until the time travel device is optimized enough to send his entire being to the past. He arrives too late as Agams had already created Terrapahaser, but is able to support his ancestor and returns to his timeline once he can entrust Kanata with both Decker's powers and the fate of Earth.
: A local historian and the last remaining , a tribe that worships Ragon as their protector. 70 years prior to the series, the young Urasawa played with Ragon and was forced to part ways with the monster when it returned to its original dimension. While taking the job as a historian and trying to keep Ragon's legacy alive, she disguises herself as the monster to scare away developers who try to destroy the Ama's Arch in Mount Uzume. When the real Ragon rampages out of anger for being forgotten, Urasawa quells the monster and prepares to join Ragon in its departure, but Ichika and Ultraman Decker stop her before the portal closes. In the aftermath, she has made peace with Ragon's departure and gives Ichika the seashell from said monster as a parting gift.
: The chairman of Scitech Laboratory Holdings. Having acquired a Sphere Soldier specimen, he aims to benefit the S-Plasma essence from the creature as a form of a renewable energy source, but the experiment resulted with said creature resurrecting itself and assimilating with the entire facility into Sphere-Geomos.

Monsters and aliens

Ultraman Trigger: New Generation Tiga
Dark Monsters
The  are creatures manipulated by the Giants of Darkness in their attack against humanity.

: An ancient monster that appears as a hybrid of Golza and Melba from episode 1 of Ultraman Tiga. It was manipulated by Carmeara to attack the Martian colony and the underground pyramid where Trigger's petrified form was put to rest, but Kengo merged with the statue to bring Trigger back to life. The newly awakened Trigger fought the combined forces of Carmeara and Golba, resulting in the death of the latter monster when it was used as a meat shield against Zeperion Beam.
: An improved variant of the original Golba. It was launched after the entire GUTS-Select was put under the Morpheus D trance and manipulated by Kyriel to test their worth as potential saviors. Golba II was killed by Glitter Trigger Eternity's Eternity Banish.
: A monster that swallowed the Trigger Sky Type Hyper Key and was manipulated by Rylar into fighting against Trigger, who later on destroyed it after reclaiming said power for his own use. First appeared in episode 6 of Ultraman Tiga.
: A corrupted version of Gazort that Hudram forced into being by merging countless  with his dark tornado, using it to draw out Yuzare's sprit. It was killed by Ultraman Trigger Sky Type's Runboldt Arrow Strike.
: The first monster that mankind encountered six years prior to Ultraman Trigger, hence the nickname . During Deathdrago's first appearance, it fought against the GUTS Wing piloted by Mitsukuni Shizuma, forcing it to retreat but not without killing Akito's parents. Its presence convinced the worldwide governments into joining forces with Sizuma Foundation and forming TPU, as well as GUTS-Select. In the present day, Deathdrago appeared to resume its rampaging spree, only to be forced to retreat underground once it was overpowered by Trigger. Its horns can be used to unleash electrical discharges. In Episode Z, another Deathdrago was manipulated by Rylar to fight against Ultraman Trigger and Z.
: While recuperating from its injuries underground, Carmeara empowered Deathdrago into a Dark Monster, gaining enhanced electrical attacks at the cost of its own free will. The monster resurfaced and fought against Trigger while Darrgon was targeting Yuna. It was killed by Trigger Sky Type's Runboldt Arrow Strike.
: One of the many monsters that rampaged on Earth during the Ultra-Ancient Civilization era. It was petrified into a stone statue after being deflected with its own petrifying beam by Yuzare, until its old master reawaken her in the present day to target Yuna. With the help of Mitsukuni in GUTS Wing, the monster's main eye was injured for Trigger to bisect it with his Multi Sword. Gargorgon's data was later saved into a Monster Key that GUTS-Select uses to petrify Metsu-Orochi at the cost of Nursedessei's Maxima Nurse Cannon. First appeared in episode 6 of Ultraman X.

Others
: A space monster that had been on Earth at an unspecified point of time. It emerged from the sea where GUTS Falcon fought against it and was killed by Trigger after he pins the monster to the ground and firing Zeperion Beam at point blank. First appeared in episode 17 of Ultraman 80.
: An underground variant of Gubila from episode 24 of Ultraman, the monster having adapted from its usual aquatic environment to evolve into an underground monster. Oka-Gubila surfaces after Ignis stole an ancient artifact which acted as a beacon for the monster, chasing the alien until he dropped the device. As Trigger fought the monster, Akito lured Oka-Gubila away from Yuna using the artifact, allowing Trigger to finish it with Delacium Claw Impact.
: A modified variant of Gigadelos from episode 14 of Ultraman Taiga. It was originally built by aliens for protection purposes, but the robot went berserk and assigned to Earth under Hudram's orders. With Ignis helped the team with disabling Satandelos' barrier generator, GUTS-Select was able to destroy the monster with Nursedessei's Nurse Cannon.
: A space pirate who stole the King Joe SC from STORAGE, leading to a chase from Haruki/Z and Yoko/Space Sevenger. After using Bullton and ended up stranded in Kengo's Earth, he came across Ignis and was forced to grow large to reclaim the stolen Ultra Medals. He was killed by the combined forces of Ultraman Trigger and Z during his futile attempt to escape.
: Barossa IV's accomplice and his personal translator. During the alien's arrival to Kengo's Earth, Kedamya stole the Ultra Medals but loses it when Ignis return them to Haruki. After Barossa IV's defeat, Kedamya left Earth after picking a fight with the Lishurian.
: A space creature with the ability to manipulate dimensions. Barossa IV summoned Bullton to escape from his pursuers, only to ended up bringing Haruki/Z as well to Kengo's Earth. First appeared in episode 17 of Ultraman.
: A series of robots developed by STORAGE to fight against monsters in Ultraman Z.
: A modified version of STORAGE's Sevenger, used for the purpose of space travel. Yoko piloted the robot while chasing Barossa IV alongside Z, only to be separated as a result of Bullton. First appeared in episode 6 of Sevenger Fight.
: A robot built through reverse engineering of a King Joe unit. It was stolen by Alien Barossa IV and ended up crashing on Kengo's Earth, where it remains there until the Dada (PDO-3) took over as part of their agenda to conquer Earth and fighting their opponents. After Dada PDO-3A possessed King Joe SC, it was scrapped by the combined powers of Trigger and Z, forcing the latter to salvage whatever remains of said robot left in hopes of fixing it once returned to STORAGE. First appeared in episode 11 of Ultraman Z.
: Digital offshoots (PDO-3A, PDO-3B, and PDO-3C) of the Dada alien race born from the latter's own DNA. They existed as computer lifeforms bent on conquering Earth through a global scale cyberattack. After failing to disable GUTS-Select through possessing their Nursedessei, the Dada hijacked King Joe SC as their support in against Trigger and Z. After the Nursedessei destroyed the Dada's nucleus, the cyber creature was killed in the destruction of King Joe SC by Trigger and Z. First appeared in episode 6 of Ultraman: The Ultimate Hero.
: An underground monster that was slumbering beneath a city. It was awakened due to the effects of the Eternity Core and later the vibrations caused by Darrgon and fought against Trigger. Due to its adaptive ability, Nanase took Akito's advice to fire hydrogen missiles to halt the monster's cells for Trigger to finish it with Deracium Beam Torrent. First appeared in episode 36 of Ultraman.
: Alien Wild's transportation saucer from the events of Secret Origins of the Nursedessei. As TPU fixed his ship during his stay on Earth, Alien Wild provided them with the schematics of Nurse, which allows Marluru and Akito to use it in order to design the Nursedessei. The data of Nurse was inscribed into a Monster Key for GUTS-Select to transform their ship into its Battle Mode. First appeared in episode 11 of Ultraseven.
: A monster that is based on Woola of Ultraman Taiga, it was notorious for consuming and ravaged on countless astronomical objects before arriving on Earth. Due to its destructive nature, Hudram has no intention of using it to find the Eternity Core, but decided to unleash it to mankind to satiate his own twisted enjoyment. It was defeated by Nursedessei's Maxima Nurse Cannon after Trigger lift it up, but Metsu-Orga used the previously absorbed energies to evolve into Metsu-Orochi.
: Metsu-Orga's later evolution, resembling Maga-Orochi of Ultraman Orb. With all means if weaponry failed, GUTS-Select was forced to temporarily petrify Orochi with Gargorgon's power at the cost of Nursedessei's Maxima Nurse Cannon. The next day, Ignis/Trigger Dark fought against the monster as Kengo in GUTS Falcon destroys Orochi's horn, stripping it of its absorption powers and allowing Glitter Trigger Eternity to finish it with Eternity Banish. Metsu-Orochi also appeared in a flashback in episode 17 of Ultraman Decker.
Lishurians (17): Ignis' race of aliens from Planet Lishuria, most of them perished during Hudram's invasion on their planet, leaving the former as a sole survivor.
: A monster from Trigger Dark and Carmeara's past. First appeared in episode 5 of Ultraman Taiga.
: A race of beings from the other dimension who previously fought against Ultraman Tiga in his titular series in a bid to earn the title of mankind's savior. Kyriel appeared in a human form in Kengo's world where he manipulated the  energy wave to put the GUTS-Select and the Giants of Darkness into a state of trance to determine their status as mankind's savior, eventually gaining the candidate in the form of Yuna. When Yuna choose to support Trigger in his fight against the Giants of Darkness, Kyriel decides to fight the Ultra on his own.
: The Kyriels' combat form, used to fight Trigger after he was exhausted from fighting the Giants of Darkness. The tide of the battle is then changed to Trigger's favor when Tiga joins the fight and is killed by the combination of both Ultras' Zeperion Beams. First appeared in episode 3 of Ultraman Tiga.
Prior to the series, Barriguiler had once arrived on Earth and faced against Yuzare from the Ultra Ancient Era before he left after being defeated. In the present day, he was hired by Hudram to capture Yuna in exchange of his favorite food, facing against Trigger along the way and even using Akito as a leverage. Once Yuna revealed the space creature of Hudram's empty promise, Barriguiler assists Trigger in defeating Hudram and departed from Earth on good terms.
: An ancient monster from 350 million years prior who was sealed alongside its rival Banila due to their poisonous body composition. The lightning from Barriguiler's attack caused Aboras to be resurrected first before Banila joins along as they fought in the middle of the city. Aboras was killed by Glitter Trigger Eternity, while its poisonous essence was purified by Trigger Dark to prevent damages to the nearby environment. First appeared in episode 19 of Ultraman.
: Aboras' rival who share the same fate of being sealed in the distant past before the two were released to fight against each others. Due to Banila's flame capable of cancelling out Aboras' foam, Trigger Dark use it to save Kengo before for both Triggers to fight against them. Banila was destroyed by Trigger Dark, followed by Glitter Trigger Eternity purging the poison away from populated areas. First appeared in episode 19 of Ultraman.
: A samurai mecha that Ignis installs as his trap system to prevent Kengo and Akito's interference from his search for the Eternity Core. The mecha was destroyed by Glitter Trigger Eternity and Nursedessei's Battle Mode, with its sword used by Trigger Dark in his final fight against Hudram.
: One of the many monsters to exist since the Ultra Ancient Civilization, who had its data inscribed into a Monster Key used by GUTS-Select as part of empowering their attacks. Gomora was one of the many Earth monsters to surface during Megalothor's reign of terror. First appeared in episode 26 of Ultraman.
 and : Two of the many Earth monsters to surface during Megalothor's reign of terror. First appeared in episodes 22 of Ultraman and episode 1 of Return of Ultraman respectively.
: One of the many Earth monsters to surface during Megalothor's reign of terror. Two years later, it was manipulated by the Rylar cult into attacking the TPU headquarters to cover their escape. It fought against and was destroyed by Ultraman Z Alpha Edge. First appeared in episode 18 of Ultra Q.
: A monster that Rylar manipulated alongside the second Deathdrago, fighting against Trigger and Z. First appeared in episode 1 of Ultraman Z.

Ultra Galaxy Fight: The Destined Crossroad
: Musashi's bird monster companion from Earth, it joined the fight with Cosmos in against the invading Absolutians. First appeared in episode 1 of Ultraman Cosmos.
First appeared in episode 18 of Return of Ultraman.
: The Belial Galactic Empire's mass-produced combat robots that guarded a Devil Splinter in the ruins of the empire until X, Geed, and Titas destroyed them. First appeared in Ultraman Zero: The Revenge of Belial.
: The Belial Galactic Empire's mass-produced combat robots that guarded a Devil Splinter in the ruins of the empire until X, Geed, and Titas destroyed them. First appeared in Ultraman Zero: The Revenge of Belial.
The Devil Splinter is later claimed by Gina Specter under The Kingdom's orders. First appeared in episode 13 of Ultraman.
When Tartarus unleashed a platoon of Absolutian grunts on Planet Babel, Seven deployed them to support the Ultra Warriors in their fight.

Galaxy Rescue Force Voice Drama
Great Space Monster Bemstar (7): A space monster that fought against Ribut and Melos using its flight speed. It was killed by Ultraman Neos.
: An alien who appeared on an ocean planet to raise Samekichi, wanting to raise the monster at the cost of said planet's ecosystem. Joneus and Sora helped reaching a compromise with the Valky by shrinking Samekichi to an appropriate size. He is voiced by Tetsuo Kishi and first appeared in episode 53 of Ultraman Taro.
: Alien Valky's infant Samekujira, who he plans to raise on an ocean planet in anticipation of the monster's growth despite the threat it pose to the planet's ecosystem. Through an agreement with Joneus, Samekichi was shrunk into a manageable size for Valky's convenience. Its race first appeared in episode 53 of Ultraman Taro.
: Originally traveling with its herd, a single Dinozaur went split from its group and landed on a planet. Ribut and Poccola were forced to purge Dinozaur off the planet when its presence threatened the ecosystem. First appeared in episode 1 of Ultraman Mebius.
: Alien Babarue RB's Battlenizer monster, through which he uses it to commit petty thefts to make ends meet. Nova originally fought against Ribut and Melos until it was called in to retreat by its master. Following RB's enlistment into Galaxy Rescue Force, Nova is also registered into the team and is occasionally called as his support during combat. First appeared in episode 49 of Ultraman Leo.
: A holographic monster that fought against Ribut, Poccola, and RB during training in simulated combat inside the virtual simulator. It was defeated through the latter's Nova. First appeared in episode 8 of Ultraman.
: Daada's monster that was killed alongside him, Kelbim, and Giestron by the Galaxy Rescue Force members. First appeared in episode 3 of Ultraman.
: Daada's monster that was killed alongside him, Neronga, and Giestron by the Galaxy Rescue Force members. First appeared in episode 4 of Ultraman Mebius.
: Daada's monster that was killed alongside him, Neronga, and Kelbim by the Galaxy Rescue Force members. First appeared in the Ultraman Festival 2019.

Secret Origins of the Nursedessei
: An alien with a Niigata dialect whose spaceship, Nurse, crash-landed on Earth and tried to repair it through various illegal works. Although his actions were discovered, TPU decided to help him fix Nurse in return for a copy of the ship's schematics. He is portrayed by Kōichi Toshima, his race first appearing in episode 11 of Ultraseven.

Ultraman Decker
Sphere Synthetic Monsters
 are creatures born from the Spheres assimilating into their intended target, forcing them to become extensions of their will.

Ancient Monster Gomora (3): A subterranean monster that mysteriously awakened. While terrorizing the urban area, GUTS-Select members formed an attack plan by severing the monster's tail and luring it away from the citizen. First appeared in episode 26 of Ultraman.
The monster fought against Decker Strong Type and is destroyed by Dolnade Breaker. Much later, Sphere-Gomora is recreated by the Spheres as one of the three guards of the Sphere Obelisk before its death by Decker Dynamic Type.
Sphere Megalothor (7, 8): See above
Skull Monster Red King (9): A monster that Grace fights to protect Mika when it rampages in the urban area. Red King retreats when GUTS-Select joins the fray, getting infected by the Spheres off-screen.
: While retreating elsewhere, Red King gets infected by the Spheres into its current form, gaining enhanced brute strength and the ability to emit shockwaves. It retains its weak point at the neck, which GUTS Gryphon exploits by firing the Hyper Thorn Laser while Grace hold off the monster. Much later, Sphere-Red King is recreated by the Spheres as one of the three guards of the Sphere Obelisk before its death by Decker Dynamic Type.
: A clone monster which former TPU monster researcher Maki Shigenaga created using an unnamed dormant monster that she discovered and synthesize it with the cells of other monsters. To keep the monster in control and its full power at bay, she implants a control device to its brain, which is linked to her pendant. Neomegas fought against both Sadola and King Guesra as a form of demonstration before GUTS-Select catching up to her actions. When Sawa destroys the controller pendant, Neomegas went berserk with its limiter removed. In GUTS Hawk, HANE2 bails Decker from the ensuing blast and drops him to perform Dolnade Breaker. Neomegas is destroyed, with remains of its cells salvaged by TPU to prevent attempts at reviving it through cloning. The monster is based on Neosaurus from episode 16 of Ultraman Dyna.
: Using Neomegas' leftover thorn, the Spheres resurrect the monster as an addition to their forces. Sphere-Neomegas made its way to the Sorafune City's spaceport, exactly where Spheresaurus first attacked a year prior and defeats Decker through the assistance of a few Sphere Soldiers. After injecting energy substance to the Earth for overnight, Sphere-Neomegas fought against the combined forces of GUTS-Select/TPU and Ultraman Decker. The monster is obliterated by HANE2/Terraphaser's TR Mega Buster, with Decker providing cover against the Synthetic Monster's attacks. Much later, Sphere-Neomegas is recreated by the Spheres as one of the three guards of the Sphere Obelisk before its death by Decker Dynamic Type.
: An updated variant of Galactron who was one of the many leftover debris from TPU Moon Base's ruins. The robot becomes a vessel for the Spheres to fight against Ultraman Trigger and Decker and is destroyed by the Ultras' strongest forms. First appeared in Ultraman Geed the Movie.
: A monster that was born from a Sphere Soldier assimilating with building and technology. Using the power of S-Plasma, Sphere-Geomos brings several Spheresaurus from the future to continue the Sphere's assimilation process on Earth, only to be foiled by Ultraman Decker and the time-displaced Ultraman Dyna. The monster is based on Geomos and Neo Geomos from episodes 35 and 36 of Ultraman Dyna.

Others
Destructive Rampage Dragon Deathdrago (2): A monster from episode 5 of New Generation Tiga, resurfacing a year after the Spheres had isolated Earth from the solar system. Deathdrago fought against the GUTS Falcon and Ultraman Decker, managing to weaken the latter until Miclas even the playing field by trouncing the monster. It was destroyed by Decker's Selgend Beam.
: Monsters summoned through the power of light, resulted when their Mons Dimension Cards are scanned into the Ultra D Flasher. They serve as supporters to Ultraman Decker when the latter is in need of reinforcements, but their operation time is limited. Through the Ultra Dual Sword, Decker can execute  to summon all three of them at once.
Miclas (2, 5, 9, 14): A monster with heavy emphasis on brute strength. First appeared in episode 3 of Ultraseven.
Agira (6, 9, 14): A monster that uses its horn as a sole weapon. First appeared in episode 32 of Ultraseven.
Windom (9, 14): A metallic bird monster with precisive aiming from its forehead. First appeared in episode 1 of Ultraseven.
: A series of monsters commercially sold in outer space, one particular Mons-Ahgar was kept in a capsule and sent towards Earth 1,300 years prior. In the present day, Mons-Ahgar awakens after its capsule was dug out by the construction company of Tochinoki City, intending to destroy Earth to put a stop to their space exploration program. The monster is destroyed when Decker Strong Type smashes its head (the weak point), followed by GUTS Gryphon opening fire on the same spot. First appeared in episode 11 of Ultraman Dyna.
: A holographic version of the monster. First appeared in episode 1 of Ultraman.
: First appeared in episode 20 of Ultraseven.
4: A holographic version of the alien which appears in GUTS-Select's virtual training simulation.
Movie: One of the many servants under Professor Gibellus who invades the Nursedessei.
: An Eleking which "Yuko" keeps as a pet, working ends meet to sustain both the monster and her life. Because of Yuko overfeeding it and the Earth's atmospheric influence, Eleking grew rapidly to the size of an adult monster within a year, catching the attention of GUTS-Select when it consumes electricity at a nearby urban area. Eleking turned violent when it was overfed with TPU's emergency electricity supply until Ultraman Decker stops the monster with Miracle Type and regressing it back to its larva form. Because of this, Elly gets to live with Yuko once more, now with its feeding habit guided by Sawa. Its race first appeared in episode 3 of Ultraseven.
: Elly's transitional form from its larva stage to a fully grown adult. First appeared in Ultraman Mebius as a Maquette Monster copy of the original monster.
: Earth-dwelling monsters that lived beneath the park of Sorafune City. The nest has since obliterated from Nursedessei Maxima Nurse Cannon.
Pagos (6): A monster that surfaces to feed on the mined Supercritical Metal, its appearance is heralded by a golden rainbow. After Decker gets dragged underground, Pagos team up with Gudon to fight the Ultra in their territory until Ryumon/GUTS Falcon fired a marker on Pagos' nape, allowing Nursedessei to destroy the monster and the Twintail colony nearing it.
: Pagos' companion and the Twintails' predator who attacks from beneath the ground. Dragging Decker to their nest, Gudon proceed to team up with Pagos until it was teleported to the surface world by Decker Miracle Type and destroyed by Realiut Wave. First appeared in episode 5 of Return of Ultraman.
Telesdon (6): A monster that shares its nest with Gudon and Pagos, joining the two in overwhelming Decker. It was destroyed by the recently-summoned Agira.
: A group of monsters that lived underground, with Decker and Ryumon/GUTS Falcon happen to stumble upon their nest in the middle of fighting the other subterranean monsters. The Twintails are destroyed by Nursedessei Battle Mode's Maxima Nurse Cannon. First appeared in episode 5 of Return of Ultraman.
When Carmeara ventured into the Eternity Core and transform into Megalothor, remnant of said plant latched into the monster. 10 years later, Gijeran is revived when Megalothor is resurrected by the power of Sphere, growing from a small flower to gigantic proportion overnight. To counter its hallucinating pollen, Yuna delivers the herbicide which is loaded into Nursedessei, spraying it causes the plant to wilt. The plant is based on Gijera from episode 45 of Ultraman Tiga.
He was originally intend to reach out to Ultraman Trigger as his final fight before retirement, but is trapped on Earth alongside Mika when the Spheres isolated the entire planet. A year later when he encounters Kanata and briefly return to fight Red King, GUTS-Select agrees to honor his wish, but the Sphere-Red King's intervention forces him to forfeit and held the monster long enough for GUTS Gryphon to take aim. Grace survives the fight nevertheless and is last seen under treatment from TPU.
: Grace's daughter, who supports him in his career as a fighter. Her attempts at blackmailing Kanata is quickly shot down by Grace, but nevertheless gets her wish at seeing him fighting alongside Decker in against Sphere-Red King.
: A monster which becomes Neomegas' first kill during its rampage in the urban area. First appeared in episode 3 of Return of Ultraman.
: A venomous monster which rampages in an urban area. It was killed by Neomegas after firing its heat ray at point blank. First appeared in Superior Ultraman 8 Brothers.
Transformation Monster Gazort (11): A monster who disrupts the delivery of Terraphaser mid-air, forcing the robot to go on an unauthorized fight to defend itself. Gazort then left after the robot successfully delivered to its testing fight, with Raibasser and its flock of children succeeding the attack.
: A horned variant of Maga-Basser from episode 1 of Ultraman Orb, which has the ability to summon an electromagnetic typhoon and shooting volts of lightning from its abdomen. Raibasser continues where Gazort left off by disabling Terraphaser to the point of frying its original AI, forcing Asakage to replace it wth HANE2 as the designated pilot. Terraphaser then uses its arsenal to overpower the bird monter, followed by Ultraman Decker delivering Triple Decker Scram as the finishing blow to destroy it.
: The Raibasser's chick who travels in a flock, attacking the GUTS-Select members to prevent getting HANE2 to activate Terraphaser. Once Raibasser begins to fight the robot, a human sized Ultraman Decker joins them in killing the small monsters before he rises up to deliver the killing blow against their giant brethren.
: A monster that appeared targeting the city prior to Spheresaurus' return. It was killed by the combined power of Decker and Terraphaser. First appeared in episode 7 of Ultraman 80.
: A Bazdor native and Agams' wife, she lost her life during the Sphere's invasion on their planet. Her death becomes the catalyst to Agams' resentment towards mankind as a whole. When Mother Spheresaurus is about to approach the Earth, Laelia's spirit appears in front of Agams, encouraging him to make amends and finally redeeming himself.
It fought against and is killed by Decker's Decker Strong Dynamic. First appeared in episode 48 of Ultraseven.
: An infant Pandon who crashed on Earth alongside the Ghosed Ore a few years prior to the Spheres imprisoning the Earth in Sphere Barrier. A few days after Agams showing his true colors to TPU, Spinnie appeared from its impact crater and frequenting at the Kariya City, where it manages to escape capture from TPU forces while visiting the Ghosed Ore on several occasions to both increase its power and accelerating its life cycle. While being chased by GUTS-Select, Spinnie gets fired by the young members as it fell into the crater, only to rise as an adult Pandon.
: A monster who is recognized by TPU as the larger variant of the smaller Gomess breed. Gomess (S) marches towards the Komie City around the same time when Murahoshi gets suspended by TPU for going AWOL a decade prior during Metsu-Orochi's attack. When Gomess (S) penetrated through all of TPU's defenses, Murahoshi is reinstated when Ryumon is able to exonerate his captain from his charges. While still recovering from his arm injury, Kanata/Decker is able to propel Gomess (S) midair before Nursedessei fires the Neo Maxima Nurse Cannon to finish off the monster. First appeared in episode 1 of Ultra Galaxy Mega Monster Battle: Never Ending Odyssey.
: A recurring foe of the Ultra Warriors who collaborated with Agams to eliminate Decker. By posing as Agams, he lures the Ultra into a trap and banished him to outer space where he intercepted Kanata and Kengo. Narrowly able to escape from being assimilated by the Spheres, Yapool is killed by the human-sized Trigger and Decker.
: Yapool's ant-themed Terrible-Monster with burrowing capabilities. It was sent to initially dragging Ichika and Ryumon to their deaths before Decker saved them and fought the Terrible-Monster. Despite Agams' attempt at aiding Aribunta by summoning Terraphaser, the Terrible-Monster is killed by Decker Dynamic Type. Its resulting explosion is used by Yapool in a gambit to temporarily expel Decker away from Earth. First appeared in episode 5 of Ultraman Ace.
: A series of security robots stationed within the TPU Moon Base, all which were initially deactivated when the base was abandoned and being used as the Spheres' nest. During Kanata and Kengo's investigation, the robots reactivated under Yapool's will to fight against the two until they were destroyed. First appeared in episode 39 of Ultraman Dyna.
: First appeared in episode 14 of Ultraseven.
19: One of the many robots laying around the abandoned TPU Moon Base.
Movie: Another King Joe is under ownership of an Alien Pedan who works under Gibellus' orders. It is destroyed by Ultraman Dinas.
Empire Machine Soldier Legionoid (19): One of the many robots laying around the abandoned TPU Moon Base.
: An aquatic creature who was revered as a deity by the Ragonites, the latter in turn performing a dance ritual in regular basis to appease the former. In the present day, Ragon reawakens when it was no longer revered by the locals and manages to defeat Decker in a cave in. However it was quelled of its anger by Nagi and returns to its home dimension. First appeared in episode 21 of Ultra Q.
: The Ragon's smaller form that appeared 70 years prior to play alongside the young Nagi. First appeared in episode 8 of Ultraman Orb as "Ragon Jr.".
: A flying monster which Agams manipulated through a similar pendant used by Shigenaga to control Neomegas. Agams unleashed the monster when GUTS-Select surround his hideout as a distraction for his escape. It was killed by HANE2/GUTS Gryphon's Gryphon Talon Beam after GUTS-Select members anticipated the monster's arrival through their weapons. First appeared in episode 8 of Ultraman.
: A female alien and the host of Ultraman Dinas who appears in Ultraman Decker Finale: Journey to Beyond. She joins forces with GUTS-Select against Gibellus' forces.
Gibellus' alien army (Movie): An army of aliens under Professor Gibellus' leadership who has been enhanced through his experimentation and opposes GUTS-Select.
: Gibellus' servant who was killed by Ultraman Dinas. He is voiced by Tomokazu Seki and first appeared in episode 10 of Ultraseven.
Strategy Alien Alien Pedan: Gibellus' servant who uses his own King Joe model.
: Gibellus' servant who works under Alien Pedan's leadership. He is voiced by HIRO of Yasuda Dai Circus and first appeared in Ultraman Orb The Movie.
: Gibellus' servant who works under Alien Pedan's leadership.
: Professor Gibellus' servant who works under Alien Pedan's leadership.
: Gibellus' servant who invades the TPU headquarters. He also invaded Planet Ravie.
: Gibellus' servant who invades the TPU headquarters. First appeared in episode 48 of Ultraseven.
: Gibellus' servant who invades the TPU headquarters. First appeared in episode 26 of Ultra Q: Dark Fantasy.
: Gibellus' servant who invades the TPU headquarters. First appeared in episode 8 of Ultraseven X.
: Gibellus' servant who invades the Nursedessei. First appeared in episode 39 of Ultraman Mebius.
: Gibellus' servant who invades the Nursedessei. He is a tribute to Grozam from episode 43 of Ultraman Mebius.
: Gibellus' servant who invaded Planet Lavie and was killed by Ultraman Dyna. First appeared in episode 4 of Ultra Seven.
Saber Tyrant Alien Magma: Gibellus' servant who invaded Planet Lavie.
: A monster on Planet Lavie. First appeared in episode 1 of Ultraman Taiga.
: The mother of Baby Zandrias on Planet Lavie. First appeared in episode 1 of Ultraman Taiga.

Notes

References

Bibliography

External links
Official website for the cast list of Ultraman Trigger: New Generation Tiga 
Official website for the cast list of Ultraman Decker 

, Ultraman Trigger: New Generation Tiga
Trigger